Ingram Berg Shavitz (May 15, 1935 – July 5, 2015) professionally known as Burt  Shavitz, was an American beekeeper and businessman notable for founding the Burt's Bees personal care products company with businesswoman Roxanne Quimby. Shavitz's likeness is featured on the Burt's Bees products.

Early life
Burt Shavitz was born Ingram Shavitz to a Jewish family in Manhattan. He was raised in Great Neck, New York, and changed his name in 1953 when he finished high school. He spent time in the Army, and later while living in Manhattan he took photographs, including those of African American Muslim rallies and Bowery drug-dealers, that appeared in Time and Life magazines.

Business career
Shavitz eventually settled in Maine, discovered beekeeping as a source of income and met Roxanne Quimby, who would sell his wax candles at local fairs. An increase in sales and production led to them launching Burt's Bees in the 1980s. As the partnership and business grew, operations were set up in North Carolina in 1994. Soon thereafter, the partnership between Shavitz and Quimby waned, leading to Quimby buying out Shavitz's stake in the company. In 2007, Clorox purchased Burt's Bees for more than $900 million.

Documentary
A documentary film, Burt's Buzz, was released in 2014. The film discussed the life of Shavitz, his history with Burt's Bees, and his later activities as a beekeeper and businessman.

Death

Shavitz died on July 5, 2015 at the age of 80 in Bangor, Maine, from respiratory problems. He resided in Parkman, Maine.

References

American beekeepers
American business executives
American company founders
1935 births
2015 deaths
American cosmetics businesspeople
American food company founders
Businesspeople from Maine
Businesspeople from New York City
Photographers from New York (state)
20th-century American Jews
People from Great Neck, New York
People from Manhattan
People from Parkman, Maine
Deaths from respiratory failure
20th-century American businesspeople
20th-century American photographers
21st-century American Jews